Ignacio Martín Amaro (1944 – December 2021) was a Spanish politician who served as a Senator.

References

1944 births
2021 deaths
Spanish politicians
Members of the 2nd Senate of Spain
People's Party (Spain) politicians
People from Alicante